Marek Bažík  (born 9 February 1976, in Čačín) is a Slovak footballer who currently plays for TSU Allhartsberg.

External links
 

1976 births
Living people
MŠK Žilina players
FK Dukla Banská Bystrica players
FK Železiarne Podbrezová players
Czech First League players
FK Viktoria Žižkov players
Polonia Bytom players
Slovak footballers
Association football midfielders
Slovak Super Liga players
Ekstraklasa players
Expatriate footballers in Poland
Slovak expatriate sportspeople in Poland
Slovak expatriate footballers